Danielle McLaughlin is an Irish author. Her collection of short stories, Dinosaurs on Other Planets (2015), won the Windham–Campbell Literature Prize for fiction and the Sunday Times Short Story Award. Her novel The Art of Falling (2021) was shortlisted for the International Dublin Literary Award.

Works
Aoife O'Regan described The Art of Falling for RTÉ as a "family drama set in Cork, where absolutely everyone is flawed". Martina Devlin described it in the Irish Independent as "a novel about how people hurt one another emotionally, yet somehow find a way to move beyond those wounds."

Personal life
McLaughlin lives in County Cork with her husband and three children.

Publications
Dinosaurs on Other Planets (2015)
The Art of Falling. London: John Murray, 2021. .

Awards 
 Joint winner, Windham–Campbell Literature Prize, fiction category in 2019. A $165,000 prize.
 Winner, Sunday Times Short Story Award in 2019 for A Partial List of the Saved. A £30,000 prize.
 Shortlisted, International Dublin Literary Award in 2022 for The Art of Falling.

References 

Living people
21st-century Irish women writers
21st-century Irish writers
21st-century Irish short story writers
Year of birth missing (living people)